Mike Terrana (born January 21, 1960) is an American hard rock and heavy metal drummer. His first professional work was in 1984 with the MCA band Hanover Fist from Toronto, Canada, after which he recorded and toured with other bands, playing many styles of music in western New York state. Between 1987 and 1997, he was based in Los Angeles and worked with various virtuoso guitarists, including Yngwie Malmsteen, Tony Macalpine, and Steve Lukather, and bands like Kuni and Beau Nasty.

In 1997, Terrana moved to Europe, first in the Netherlands for six months and then Germany. He worked with German bands and artists such as Rage, Gamma Ray, Savage Circus, Axel Rudi Pell, Roland Grapow, and Masterplan. In 2016, Terrana joined Italian heavy metal band Vision Divine. In 2017, he also joined Spanish band Avalanch and Czech band Kreyson.

In addition, Terrana has his own three-piece hard rock band, TERRANA, and a live musical project that combines classical and rock music with operatic vocals, titled Beauty of the Beat, which he launched while working on the project Beauty and the Beat with Finnish singer Tarja Turunen.

Discography
Solo
 Shadows of the Past (1998)
 Man of the World (2005)
 Sinfonica (2011)

Artension
 Into the Eye of the Storm (1996)
 Phoenix Rising (1997)
 Sacred Pathways (2001)
 New Discovery (2002)
 Future World (2004)

Axel Rudi Pell
 The Ballads II (1999)
 The Wizard's Chosen Few (2000)
 The Masquerade Ball (2000)
 Shadow Zone (2002)
 Knights Live (2002)
 Kings and Queens (2004)
 The Ballads III (2004)
 Mystica (2006)
 Diamonds Unlocked (2007)
 Tales of the Crown (2008)
 The Best of Axel Rudi Pell: Anniversary Edition (2009)
 The Crest (2010)
 The Ballads IV (2011)
 Circle of the Oath (2012)

Avalanch
 El Ángel Caído 2017 (2017)
 Hacia La Luz – Directo desde Madrid (2018)
 El secreto (2019)
 The Secret (2019)

Beau Nasty
 Dirty But Well Dressed (1989)

Ferdy Doernberg
 Storytellers Rain (2001)
 Till I Run Out of Road (2004)

Downhell
 A Relative Coexistence (2008)

Driven
 Self-Inflicted (2001)

Emir Hot
 Sevdah Metal (2008)

Empire
 Chasing Shadows (2007)

Jean Fontanille
 Unknown Parameter Value (2008)

Roland Grapow
 Kaleidoscope (1999)

Haggard
 Tales of Ithiria (2008) (as narrator)

Hanover Fist
 Hungry Eyes (1985)

Tony Hernando
 The Shades of Truth (2002)
 Ill (2005)
 TH III-Live! CD/DVD (2006)
 Actual Events (2009)

Kuni
 Looking for Action (1988)

Kiko Loureiro
 No Gravity (2005)
 Fullblast (2009)

Marco Iacobini
 The Sky There'll Always Be (2013)

Tony MacAlpine
 Freedom to Fly (1992)
 Evolution (1995)
 Violent Machine (1996)
 Live Insanity (1997)

Yngwie Malmsteen
 The Seventh Sign (1993)
 I Can't Wait (1994)
 Best Of (2000)
 Archive Box (2001)

Masterplan
 MK II (2007)
 Time to Be King (2010)

Metalium
 Millennium Metal – Chapter One (1999)

Razorback
 Deadringer (2007)

Rage
 Welcome to the Other Side (2001)
 Best of – All G.U.N. Years (2001)
 Unity (2002)
 Soundchaser (2003)
 From the Cradle to the Stage (2004)
 Speak of the Dead (2006)
 Full Moon in St. Petersburg (2007)

Vision Divine
 When All the Heroes Are Dead (2019)

Savage Circus
 Of Doom and Death (2009)

Damir Simic
 The Quest (1998)
 Live in Zagreb (2002)
 Demomstratus (2004)

Stuart Smith
 Heaven & Earth (1998)

Squealer
 Made for Eternity (2000)
 Under the Cross (2002)

Taboo Voodoo
 Somethin's Cookin (2003)Tarja Turunen What Lies Beneath (2010)
 Act I: Live in Rosario (2012)
 Colours in the Dark (2013)
 Beauty and the Beat (2014)
 Luna Park Ride (2015)
 The Shadow Self (2016)The Dogma Black Roses (2006)Tracy G Deviating from the Set List (2003)John West Mind Journey (1997)Zillion Zillion (2004)Theodore Ziras Superhuman (2008)Kee Marcello Judas Kiss (2013)The Ferrymen The Ferrymen (2017)
 A New Evil (2019)
 One More River to Cross  (2022)Other releases Tribute to Accept (Metalium track "Burning") (1999)
 Holy Dio – A Tribute to the Voice of Metal: Ronnie James Dio (1999)

 Videography Axel Rudi Pell' Knight Treasures (Live and More) (2002)
 Live Over Europe DVD (2008)
 One Night Live DVD (2010)
 Live on Fire DVD (2012)Rage From the Cradle to the Stage Live DVD (2004)
 Full Moon in St. Petersburg Live DVD (2007)Tony Hernando Tony Hernando THIII Live DVD (2006)Tony MacAlpine Starlicks Master Session VHS (1992)
 Live in L.A. DVD (1997)Yngwie Malmsteen Live at Budokan DVD (1994)Tarja Turunen Act I : Live in Rosario (2012)
 Beauty and the Beat (2014)Terrana solo DVDs' Rhythm Beast Performance DVD (2007)
 Double Bass Mechanics DVD (1996)
 Beginning Rock Drums DVD'' (1995)

References

External links 

 

1960 births
Living people
American heavy metal drummers
Musicians from Buffalo, New York
American expatriates in Germany
20th-century American drummers
American male drummers
American people of Italian descent
Masterplan (band) members
Savage Circus members
Hardline (band) members
Metalium members
Vision Divine members
Rage (German band) members
Avalanch members
20th-century American male musicians
Yngwie J. Malmsteen's Rising Force members